is a Japanese manga conceptualized by Misato Mitsumi, Tatsuki Amazuyu, and Tamiki Wakaki and illustrated by Wakaki. An anime adaptation has been announced.

Media

Manga
Kadokawa Shoten started publishing the manga in collected  volumes on September 14, 2020. As of November 6, 2021, two volumes have been released.

Volume list

Anime
In December 2022, it was announced that the manga will receive an anime adaptation.

References

Further reading

External links
 

Doujinshi
Kadokawa Shoten manga
Works about video games